Harold Everard Monteagle Barlow FRS (15 November 1899 – 20 April 1989) was a British engineer.

He was born in Islington, London, the son of Leonard Barlow, an electrical engineer. He entered University College, London where, apart from the World War II years (which he spent at Royal Aircraft Establishment, Farnborough), he spent most of his working life. He was taught by Ambrose Fleming, who held the Pender Chair there. Barlow went on to succeed Fleming in that chair, and hence also in the post of head of department. Among his students, Barlow supervised Charles Kao, the 2009 Nobel Laureate for Physics, for a doctoral degree.

Honours and awards
In March, 1961 he was elected a Fellow of the Royal Society. His application citation stated that he: " Has made important contributions to the devising of improved measuring techniques at centimetre wavelengths. In particular has developed methods of measuring centimetre-wave power by radiation pressure and by use of the Hall Effect in semi-conductors; has made detailed studies of the conductor loss in wave guides and has added substantially to knowledge on the characteristics of surface waves. His further application of the Hall Effect to power measurement at low frequencies is likely to prove of considerable electrical engineering value. He has published two books on centimetre-wave measurements and some 35 scientific and technical papers". 

Barlow received an Honorary Doctorate from Heriot-Watt University in 1971.

In 1988, Barlow was awarded the Royal Medal of the Royal Society in Engineering category, "In recognition of his distinguished research, particularly on microwaves and waveguides, and of his lasting influence as the founder of an unusually productive research school."

See also
 Leonard Monteagle Barlow, his elder brother.

References

External links

 The Papers of Harold Barlow held at Churchill Archives Centre, Cambridge

1899 births
1989 deaths
People from Islington (district)
Royal Medal winners
Fellows of the Royal Society
Engineers from London
British electrical engineers
People educated at Wallington County Grammar School
Alumni of University College London
Academics of University College London